William Cann may refer to:
William Derwood Cann Jr. (1919–2010), college professor, manufacturing executive, and interim mayor of Monroe, Louisiana
Billy Cann (1882–1958), rugby league player
Billy Cann (politician) from 2011 Prince Edward Island general election
William Cann of the Cann baronets

See also
William Conrad (1920–1994), born John William Cann, actor
Cann (disambiguation)